The Fisherman and the Syren is an oil painting by Frederic Leighton, first exhibited in 1858. It is a composition of two small full-length figures, a mermaid clasping a fisherman round the neck. The picture is in the collection of the Bristol Museum & Art Gallery.

Description 
The painting is a composition of two figures with rocks and the sea. A young Sicilian fisherman slipping asleep down a rock into the tide is grasped round the neck by a water-nymph. He is swarthy in complexion, with dark curly hair, and nude save only for a crimson loin-cloth, his purple drapery being cast aside upon the grey rocks. The nymph is nude and blonde; her long, wavy brown hair is laced with pearls.

The subject is taken from "Der Fischer", a ballad by Goethe written in 1779:

Analysis 
According to Jones, et al., Leighton's literary pictures "suggest a preoccupation with women as destroyers", and The Fisherman and the Syren represents that theme "quite unequivocally". Leighton here explores the femme fatale archetype that became popular in Victorian art, notably in the work of the Symbolists. In 1861, in a letter to his father, Leighton explained that the picture was "as little naturalistic as anything could be".

History 

In 1858 Leighton was represented on the Royal Academy walls by two pictures: The Fisherman and the Syren, and The County Paris, accompanied by Friar Lawrence, comes to the house of the Capulets to claim his bride, both small canvases painted in Rome and in Paris.

The Fisherman and the Syren, which was painted for Signor Mario, the famous singer, initially received little friendly criticism, and the reception was generally lukewarm. However, a positive review appeared in The Daily Telegraph:

The picture was shown again in the 1897 retrospective exhibition of Leighton's art. It was first entitled The Fisherman and Syren, and afterwards The Mermaid.

References

Sources 
 Ash, Russell (1995). Lord Leighton. London: Pavilion Books Limited. p. 10.
 Barrington, Russell (1906). The Life, Letters and Work of Frederic Leighton. Vol. 2. London: George Allen, Ruskin House. pp. 36–37, 62.
 Jones, Stephen, et al. (1996). Frederic Leighton, 1830–1896. Royal Academy of Arts, London: Harry N. Abrams, Inc. pp. 74, 110, 122, 165.
 Rhys, Ernest (1900). Frederic Lord Leighton: An Illustrated Record of his Life and Work. London: George Bell & Sons. pp. 16, 107, 122.
 Staley, Edgcumbe (1906). Lord Leighton of Stretton. London: The Walter Scott Publishing Co., Ltd. pp. 53–54. 
 "Exhibition of the Royal Academy [Second Notice.]". The Daily Telegraph. Monday, 3 May 1858. pp. 5–6. 

1858 paintings
Paintings by Frederic Leighton
Nude art
Women in art
Mermaids in art
Adaptations of works by Johann Wolfgang von Goethe
Paintings based on literature